David Russell "Gus" Bell Jr. (November 15, 1928 – May 7, 1995) was an American outfielder in Major League Baseball from 1950 through 1964, who played with the Pittsburgh Pirates, Cincinnati Reds, New York Mets and Milwaukee Braves.

In his 15-year MLB career, Bell was a .281 hitter with 1,823 hits, 311 doubles, 66 triples, 206 home runs and 942 runs batted in in 1,741 games played. He was a four-time National League All-Star. Defensively, he recorded a career .985 fielding percentage playing at all three outfield positions. He was nicknamed "Gus" as a youngster because he was a fan of longtime MLB player Gus Mancuso.

Family
A native of Louisville, Kentucky, and graduate of Bishop Benedict Joseph Flaget High School, Bell was the oldest member of a rare three-generation major league family. His son Buddy has been a third baseman, coach, manager and front-office executive in the majors since 1972, and his grandsons David and Mike were MLB infielders who remained in baseball after their playing careers as coaches, managers or player development officials. 

Gus Bell wore uniform #25 during his nine years with the Cincinnati Reds (known as the "Redlegs" from 1953–58); Buddy Bell wore 25 in tribute to his father during much of his playing and managing career, including his 1985–88 tenure with the Reds.

Career

Pittsburgh Pirates
Bell was 18 years old when he made his pro debut in the Pirates' farm system in 1947. In both 1948 and 1949, he batted over .300, and led the Eastern League in hits during the latter season. A torrid start to his 1950 season at Triple-A Indianapolis — he hit .400 with 66 hits in 38 games — earned him a call-up to Pittsburgh. He debuted on May 30 playing both ends of a Memorial Day doubleheader against the St. Louis Cardinals at Forbes Field, and went four for ten; then, the following day, against the Boston Braves, he maintained the same pace, with two hits in five at bats. He ended his rookie season with a .282 batting mark in 111 games as the Bucs' starting rightfielder. 

On June 4, 1951, he hit for the cycle against the Philadelphia Phillies. In 2004, his grandson David hit for the cycle; Gus Bell and David Bell are the only grandfather-grandson duo in major league history to hit for the cycle.

But a terrible 1952 campaign, during which the Pirates compiled a franchise-worst 42–112 record and Bell slumped to a .250 batting mark in 131 games, led to his October 14, 1952, trade to the Cincinnati Reds for three players.

Cincinnati Redlegs/Reds
During his nine years with Cincinnati from  through , Bell achieved success and popularity.

Bell hit home runs in three consecutive at-bats on May 29, 1956. During the 1956 season, Bell, Ted Kluszewski and Bob Thurman became the second trio of teammates each to have three-home run games in the same season. The feat had been accomplished by the Brooklyn Dodgers in 1950 (Duke Snider, Roy Campanella and Tommy Brown) and subsequently was equally by the Cleveland Indians in 1987 (Cory Snyder, Joe Carter and Brook Jacoby).

In , Bell and six of his teammates – Ed Bailey, Johnny Temple, Roy McMillan, Don Hoak, Wally Post and Frank Robinson — were voted to the National League All-Star starting lineup, the result of a ballot stuffing campaign by Cincinnati fans. Bell remained on the team as a reserve, but Post was taken off altogether due to injury. Bell and Post were replaced as starters by Hank Aaron and Willie Mays. Bell entered the game as a pinch hitter for Robinson in the seventh and drove in both Mays and Bailey with a double against Early Wynn.

In 1961, his final year with Cincinnati, he was a part-time player (starting 54 games) on the Reds' first pennant-winning team in 21 years. In the 1961 World Series, Bell was called on to pinch hit in Games 3, 4 and 5 and went hitless in three at bats. One day after the conclusion of the Fall Classic, won by the New York Yankees four games to one, Bell was the eighth overall selection in the primary phase of the National League expansion draft by the New York Mets.

New York Mets
Bell started the  season with the Mets, and on April 11, 1962, he was the starting right fielder in the Mets' inaugural game. He became the first base runner in Met history after hitting a single in the second inning of an 11–4 loss to the Cardinals. But he collected only 15 hits in 101 at bats (.149) in 30 games with the expansion club.

Milwaukee Braves
On May 21, 1962, Bell was sent to Milwaukee to complete a November 1961 transaction in which the Mets acquired veteran slugger Frank Thomas. He batted .285 in 79 games (with 53 games started as an outfielder) to raise his 1962 season average to .241. But he had only six more MLB at bats as a Brave in 1963–64 until he was released on May 12, 1964, during the roster cutdown then in effect in the major leagues.

Post-playing career
Bell was inducted into the Cincinnati Reds Hall of Fame in 1964. After his playing career, he worked for an auto dealership, ran a temporary employment agency, and was a scout for the Cleveland Indians and Texas Rangers. Bell died in May 1995, at Bethesda North Hospital near Cincinnati; he had recently had a heart attack. He was survived by seven children and 36 grandchildren.

On what would have been Bell's 83rd birthday – November 15, 2011 – he was inducted into the Louisville Catholic Sports Hall of Fame, with a speech by his grandson David.

See also
 List of Major League Baseball players to hit for the cycle
 List of Major League Baseball annual triples leaders
 List of second-generation Major League Baseball players

References

External links

Gus Bell at The Deadball Era

Gus Bell Chronology and Facts at This Day In Baseball

1928 births
1995 deaths
Albany Senators players
American Roman Catholics
Baseball players from Louisville, Kentucky
Cincinnati Redlegs players
Cincinnati Reds players
Cleveland Indians scouts
Hollywood Stars players
Indianapolis Indians players
Keokuk Pirates players
Leesburg Pirates players
Major League Baseball center fielders
Major League Baseball right fielders
Milwaukee Braves players
National League All-Stars
New York Mets players
Pittsburgh Pirates players
Texas Rangers scouts